Paul Winslow may refer to:

 Paul Winslow (cricketer) (1929–2011), South African cricketer 
 Paul Winslow (American football) (born 1938), former defensive back in the National Football League